"Namae wa, Mada Nai" (名前は、未だ無ひ。; I Don't Yet Have a Name) is the first single release by Japanese rock band Alice Nine. It was released on July 5, 2004.

Track listing
 "Time Machine" (タイムマシン)
 "Merou ni Shizunde" (メロウに沈んで; Sinking in Mellowness)
 "Hana Ichi Monme" (華一匁)

References

External links
 King Records' Official Website
 Official myspace

2004 singles
Alice Nine songs
2004 songs